Babak Nourzad (born 14 August 1978 in Ghaemshahr) is an Iranian former wrestler who competed in the 2004 Summer Olympics.

References

External links
 

1978 births
Living people
People from Qaem Shahr
Iranian male sport wrestlers
Olympic wrestlers of Iran
Wrestlers at the 2004 Summer Olympics
World Wrestling Championships medalists
Sportspeople from Mazandaran province
21st-century Iranian people